Hu Xingyu (born 21 July 2001) is a Chinese footballer currently playing as a midfielder for Chengdu Rongcheng.

Club career
Hu Xingyu was promoted to the senior team of Chongqing Lifan within the 2020 Chinese Super League season and would make his debut in a Chinese FA Cup game on 19 September 2020 against Shanghai SIPG F.C. in a 3-2 defeat. He would be loaned out to Suzhou Dongwu F.C. and then China U-20, however he would leave leave the team after the club was dissolved on 24 May 2022 after the majority owner, Wuhan Dangdai Group could not restructure the clubs shareholdings and debt.

On 2 June 2022, Hu would join newly promoted top tier club Chengdu Rongcheng on a free transfer for the start of the 2022 Chinese Super League season. He would go on to make his debut in a league game on 16 June 2022 against Tianjin Jinmen Tiger in a 1-1 draw.

Career statistics

References

External links

2001 births
Living people
Chinese footballers
Association football midfielders
Chongqing Liangjiang Athletic F.C. players